IBRIX Fusion is a parallel file system combined with a logical volume manager, availability features and a management interface.  The software was produced, sold, and supported by IBRIX Incorporated of Billerica, Massachusetts.  HP announced on July 17, 2009 that it had reached a definitive agreement to acquire IBRIX.  Subsequent to the acquisition, the software components of IBRIX have been combined with ProLiant servers to form the X9000 series of storage systems.

The X9000 storage systems are designed to provide network-attached storage over both standard protocols (SMB, NFS, HTTP and NDMP) as well as a proprietary protocol.

It is used in the HPE StoreOnce (former D2D) products.

See also 
List of file systems
Distributed file system

References

External links 
Product information

Network file systems